

Super League

The 2017 Chinese Women's Super League season was the league's third season in its current incarnation, and the 21st total season of the women's association football league in China.

Dalian Quanjian were the defending champions

League table

League One

League table

Super League Relegation Playoff

References

External links
Season at futbol24.com

2017
2017–18 domestic women's association football leagues
2016–17 domestic women's association football leagues
+